Organisation of the Commissioner for Philately and Scripophily was established in Moscow in 1922 by the All-Russian Central Executive Committee (VTsIK) for matters concerned with philately and bonds. An old Bolshevik Feodor Chuchin headed this organisation.

History 
To help finance the Central Famine Relief Committee (POMGOL), VTsIK decided to sell abroad postage stamps of Imperial Russia and the newly formed governments of the Civil War period. The idea was to obtain hard currency for them. Feodor Chuchin was named in 1921 the POMGOL commissioner for matters pertaining to stamp donations.

In March 1922, the Organisation of the Commissioner for Philately and Scripophily was set up. Chuchin was appointed to supervise its activities in Soviet Russia and abroad. The sale of stamps and paper money was profitable:

The Organisation of the Commissioner for Philately and Scripophily  existed till 1926 and was superseded by the Soviet Philatelic Association.

See also

Notes

References

Further reading 
  Archived from the original and another source on 2015-05-15.

External links 
 

Philately of the Soviet Union
1922 establishments in Russia
1928 disestablishments
1920s disestablishments in the Soviet Union
Government agencies of Russia
Philatelic organizations
Defunct organizations based in Russia
Organizations established in 1922
Organizations disestablished in 1926